Jason Gatson (born June 25, 1980) is a retired American gymnast.

Gatson competed in his first World Championship in 1997 at the age of 17, where he placed 5th with team USA and 22nd in the all-around. He was considered by many to be the next champion for the US team, but injuries and other struggles cost him a chance for the 2000 Olympic team.

Injuries would continue to be a problem for Gatson, but in 2003 he finished second in the US national championships and qualified to the World Championship team, where he and his fellow team members won a silver medal in the team competition. He also competed in the all-around final and still rings final, finishing 8th and 7th respectively.

Gatson would battle a back injury heading into the 2004 Olympic trials. Still, he was able to make the Olympic team despite not competing on all of the events. At the olympics, Gatson and his team won a silver medal behind Japan. In team finals, Gatson scored 9.825 on his parallel bars routine, the highest score of the day on that apparatus.

His knee injuries were featured on the season 2 8th episode on Impact: Stories of Survival, titled "Pentagon Survivor". 
    
Jason's younger brother Brandon is a professional wrestler.

References

External links
 https://web.archive.org/web/20090313014625/http://www.kristypage.net/jasongatson/bio.html
 Gymnast lands on his feet
 2004 Olympic games results
 Gatson1(Parallel bars)

1980 births
Living people
Gymnasts at the 2004 Summer Olympics
Medalists at the World Artistic Gymnastics Championships
Place of birth missing (living people)
Medalists at the 2004 Summer Olympics
Olympic silver medalists for the United States in gymnastics
Originators of elements in artistic gymnastics